This is a list of painters of Saint Petersburg Union of Artists (founded 2 August 1932 as the Leningrad Union of Soviet Artists, since 1959 named as the Leningrad branch of Union of Artists of Russian Federation. Acquired its current name after the renaming of Leningrad in Saint Petersburg in 1991). This list represents the Soviet era and contemporary Russian painters from Leningrad/Saint Petersburg. The basis for inclusion in this List can serve as the membership of the painter at the Saint Petersburg Union of Artists, confirmed by authoritative sources.

Alphabetical list


A

B

C

E

F

G

K

L

M

N

O

P

R

S

T

V

Z

See also
List of Russian artists
Saint Petersburg Union of Artists
Russian culture
List of 20th-century Russian painters
1957 in Fine Arts of the Soviet Union

Sources
 Artists of peoples of the USSR. Biography Dictionary. Volume 1. – Moscow: Iskusstvo, 1970.
 Artists of peoples of the USSR. Biography Dictionary. Volume 2. – Moscow: Iskusstvo, 1972.
 Fine Arts of the Leningrad. Exhibition Catalogue. – Leningrad: Khudozhnik RSFSR, 1976.
 Directory of Members of Union of Artists of USSR. Volume 1,2. – Moscow: Soviet Artist Edition, 1979.
 Directory of Members of the Leningrad branch of the Union of Artists of Russian Federation. – Leningrad: Khudozhnik RSFSR, 1980.
 Artists of peoples of the USSR. Biography Dictionary. Volume 4 Book 1. – Moscow: Iskusstvo, 1983.
 Directory of Members of the Leningrad branch of the Union of Artists of Russian Federation. – Leningrad: Khudozhnik RSFSR, 1987.
 Artists of peoples of the USSR. Biography Dictionary. Volume 4 Book 2. – Saint Petersburg: Academic project humanitarian agency, 1995.
 Link of Times: 1932 – 1997. Artists – Members of Saint Petersburg Union of Artists of Russia. Exhibition catalogue. – Saint Petersburg: Manezh Central Exhibition Hall, 1997.
 Matthew C. Bown. Dictionary of 20th Century Russian and Soviet Painters 1900-1980s. – London: Izomar 1998.
 Vern G. Swanson. Soviet Impressionism. – Woodbridge, England: Antique Collectors' Club, 2001.
 Sergei V. Ivanov. Unknown Socialist Realism. The Leningrad School. – Saint-Petersburg: NP-Print Edition, 2007. – , .
 Anniversary Directory graduates of Saint Petersburg State Academic Institute of Painting, Sculpture, and Architecture named after Ilya Repin, Russian Academy of Arts. 1915 – 2005. – Saint Petersburg: Pervotsvet Publishing House, 2007.
 Igor N. Pishny. The Leningrad School of painting. Socialist realism of 1930-1980s: Selected names. – Saint Petersburg: Kolomenskaya versta, 2008. – .

External links 
 Artist Vladimir Ovchinnikov (1911–1978). Masterpieces of landscape paintings (VIDEO)
 Artist Sergei Ivanovich Osipov (1915–1985). Masterpieces of paintings (VIDEO)
 Artist Nikolai Timkov (1912–1993). Masterpieces of landscape paintings (VIDEO)
 Artist Gevork Vartanovich Kotiantz (1906–1996). Masterpieces of paintings (VIDEO)
 Artist Nikolai Romanov. Landscape paintings of 1990-2010s (VIDEO)
 Artist Alexander Mikhailovich Semionov (1922–1984) (VIDEO)
 Artist Nikolai Galakhov. Landscape paintings of 1960-1990s (VIDEO)
 Artist Nikolai Pozdneev (1930–1978) (VIDEO)
 Artist Lev Russov (1926–1987). Masterpieces of Portrait Painting. Part 1 (VIDEO)
 Artist Lev Russov (1926–1987). Masterpieces of paintings. Part 2 (VIDEO)
 Artist Eugenia Petrovna Antipova (1917–2009) (VIDEO)
 Artist Victor Teterin (1922–1991). Painting and Watercolors (VIDEO)
 Artist Alexander Samokhvalov (1894–1971). Masterpieces of paintings (VIDEO)
 Artist Arseny Nikiforovich Semionov (1911–1992). Painting. Part 1 (VIDEO)
 Leningrad Motives in paintings of Arseny Semionov (1911–1992) (VIDEO)
 Portrait painting of 1920-1990s. The Leningrad School. Part 1 (VIDEO)
 Portrait in painting of 1920-1990s. The Leningrad School. Part 2 (VIDEO)
 Portrait in painting of 1920-1990s. The Leningrad School. Part 3 (VIDEO)
 Children in Painting of 1950-1980s. The Leningrad School. Part 1 (VIDEO)
 Children and Youth in Painting of 1950-1980s. The Leningrad School. Part 2 (VIDEO)
 The City of Leningrad and his citizens in paintings of 1930-1990s. Part 1 (VIDEO)
 The City of Leningrad and his citizens in paintings of 1930-1990s. Part 2 (VIDEO)
 Still life in Painting of 1930-1990s. The Leningrad School. Part 1 (VIDEO)
 Still life in Painting of 1930-1990s. The Leningrad School. Part 2 (VIDEO)
 Still life in Painting of 1930-1990s. The Leningrad School. Part 3 (VIDEO)
 Crimea in paintings of 1950-1990s. The Leningrad School (VIDEO)
 Spring Motives in Painting of 1950-1990s. The Leningrad School (VIDEO)

Saint Petersburg painters

Artists
Artists